Arthur H. Hider (1870-1952), was a Canadian painter and commercial illustrator. Hider was born in London, England. He moved to Canada at age two.

He became an apprentice at a lithographer in Toronto, Canada when he was fifteen. He went on to work for Rolph-Clark-Stone for sixty years. Much of his work consisted of illustrating calendars. Gerlach Barlow Co. commissioned several of his paintings for their calendars. His art depicting Robin Hood for the cover of the Robin Hood Flour Cook Book was painted before the 1912 name change; but it continued to be used in promotions for many years.

Haider was also known for his paintings illustrating the Boer War.

References

External links
 War recruitment posters at World Digital Library
 
 La Vérendrye at the Lake of the Woods

1870 births
1952 deaths
Canadian illustrators